Å is a village in Ibestad Municipality in Troms og Finnmark county, Norway. The village of Å and the neighboring villages of Laupstad and Ånstad altogether have a total population (2001) of 205 residents.

Name
The village (originally a farm) was first mentioned in 1375 ("Aam"). The name was originally the plural of the Old Norse word á, which means "(small) river". (There is just one river here, so the plural form might be explained by the fact that the farm was divided in two parts.)

References

Villages in Troms
Ibestad